Dignan is an indie rock band from McAllen, TX.

Band members

Current 
 Andy Pena – Guitar, Lead vocals
 Devin Garcia – Bass guitar
 David Palomo – Various instruments (Accordion, Glockenspiel), Backup Vocals
 Charlie Vela

Former 
 Heidi Plueger - Keyboards, Backup Vocals
 Trey Perez - Drums, Backup Vocals
 Nathan Kizzia - Guitar, Trumpet, Backup Vocals

Discography 
 The Guest (2007)
 Tangled Woods Session (2008)
 Cheaters & Thieves (2009)

External links 
 Dignan on Bandcamp
 Dignan on Facebook
 Dignan on Twitter
 Dignan on Purevolume
 Dignan on MySpace

Alternative rock groups from Texas
Indie rock musical groups from Texas